Kelli Sobonya (born July 13, 1963) is a former Republican member of the West Virginia House of Delegates.  She represented District 18 from 2002 to 2018.

Sobonya received her Diploma from Ambridge High School.  She went on to receive her Certification in Computer Science from the Institute of Computer Management in Pittsburgh, Pennsylvania in 1982.

Sobonya worked as an Administrative Assistant for Covenant School and for Ashland Oil, Incorporated from 1983 to 1987.  She was a Managed Care Coordinator for the Department of Family and Community Health at the Marshall University School of Medicine from 1988 to 1995.  She was also the owner of Gym Factory Tumble Jungle, Incorporated from 1988 to 2005.  From 1996 to 2007, Sobonya was a Realtor for Metro Properties, and has worked as a Realtor for Century 21 Home and Land Incorporated since 2007.

References

External links
http://www.legis.state.wv.us/House/members/delmemview1.cfm
http://vote4kelli.com/

1963 births
Living people
Republican Party members of the West Virginia House of Delegates
Marshall University alumni
People from Ironton, Ohio
Women state legislators in West Virginia
21st-century American politicians
21st-century American women politicians
People from Cabell County, West Virginia